The Treaty of Hartford was a treaty concluded between New England, the Mohegan and the Narragansett on September 21, 1638, in Hartford, Connecticut.

Background 
The Pequot War of 1636 and 1637 saw the virtual elimination of the Pequot Indians. The victors, English colonists living along the Connecticut River and their Mohegan and Narragansett allies, met to decide on the division of the fruits of victory.

The treaty 
The Mohegan and Narragansett tribes and the three English settlements in New England that would become the Connecticut River Colony in 1639, participated in the treaty. Surviving Pequot prisoners were divided between the tribes, with an unspecified number of captives being kept by the New England colonists; each tribe received 80 captives, with 20 captives being awarded to Ninigret, a sachem of the Eastern Niantic who were allied with the Narragansett.

The Pequot lands went to the Connecticut River towns. The other major feature of this treaty was to outlaw the Pequot name. Any survivors would be referred to in the future as Mohegans or Narragansett. No Pequot town or settlement would be allowed. This treaty was signed on September 21, 1638.

The Massachusetts Bay Colony, which had also participated in the anti-Pequot alliance, was not a party to the Treaty of Hartford. This led to a dispute between Massachusetts and Connecticut, with the Bay colony insisting that the Treaty of Hartford usurped its rights over Pequot lands under previous agreements with the Narragansetts and the Mohegans.

Further reading 
Daragh Grant, "The Treaty of Hartford (1638): Reconsidering Jurisdiction in Southern New England," The William and Mary Quarterly, 3rd Ser., 72, No. 3 (July 2015): 461–98. Pages 495–98 contain a transcript that reconstructs the 1638 Treaty from three later copies recorded in 1665, 1705, and 1743.
Alden T. Vaughan, New England Frontier: Puritans and Indians, 1620–1675, 3d ed. (Norman, Okla., 1995), 340–41.

References 

Pre-statehood history of Connecticut
History of Hartford, Connecticut
History of the Thirteen Colonies
Hartford
1638 in Connecticut
Pequot War
Hartford